Government Ananda Mohan College is a higher secondary school and National University, Bangladesh affiliated college in Mymensingh, Bangladesh. One of the oldest educational premises in South Asia, the institute was established in 1883 by Ananda Mohan Bose as City Collegiate School during British Raj.

History
Anandamohan Bose, who founded the City College in 1878, decided to open a branch of it at his home town in Mymensingh. In 1883, an educational institution was established at the residence of Ananda Mohan as the City Collegiate School. Later the college section of the institution was shifted to College Road on 1 January 1908 as a college and it was named after him. In 1964, the college was nationalized.

Notable alumni
 Nurul Amin – Is bengali Politician and 8th Prime Minister of Pakistan and acting President of Pakistan
 Abul Fateh — diplomat, statesman and Sufi
 Surendra Mohan Ghose — revolutionary
 Nirmalendu Goon — poet
 Prabodh Chandra Goswami — educationist
 Abdul Hye Mashreki — poet
 Niharranjan Ray — historian
 P. C. Sorcar — magician
 Ekramul Haque Titu – Bangladeshi Politician and 1st Mayor of Mymensingh
 Syed Waliullah — novelist

See also
 Gurudayal Government College
 Muminunnesa Women's College
 Pakundia Adarsha Mohila College

Notes

Colleges affiliated to National University, Bangladesh
Educational institutions established in 1908
1908 establishments in India
Colleges in Mymensingh District
Ananda Mohan College